Karcag is a district in eastern part of Jász-Nagykun-Szolnok County, Hungary. Karcag is also the name of the town where the district seat is found. The district is located in the Northern Great Plain Statistical Region. This district is a part of Nagykunság historical and geographical region.

Geography 
Karcag District borders with  Püspökladány District (Hajdú-Bihar County) to the east, Szeghalom District and Gyomaendrőd District (Békés County) to the southeast, Mezőtúr District to the south, Törökszentmiklós District and Kunhegyes District to the west. The number of the inhabited places in Karcag District is 5.

History 
The Karcag District is one of the newly created districts in 2013 and did not exist before the closure of the districts in 1983. Karcag had never been a district seat before, but as a city it had never belonged to any district, and since its creation in 1994 it has been a Karcag Subregion seat.

Municipalities 
The district has 3 towns, 1 large village and 1 village.
(ordered by population, as of 1 January 2012)

The bolded municipalities are cities, italics municipality is large village.

Demographics

In 2011, it had a population of 43,226 and the population density was 50/km².

Ethnicity
Besides the Hungarian majority, the main minorities are the Roma (approx. 3,500) and German (100).

Total population (2011 census): 43,226
Ethnic groups (2011 census): Identified themselves: 41,613 persons:
Hungarians: 37,755 (90.73%)
Gypsies: 3,421 (8.22%)
Others and indefinable: 437 (1.05%)
Approx. 1,500 persons in Karcag District did not declare their ethnic group at the 2011 census.

Religion
Religious adherence in the county according to 2011 census:

Reformed – 9,969;
Catholic – 5,894 (Roman Catholic – 5,816; Greek Catholic – 78);
Evangelical – 48; 
other religions – 563; 
Non-religious – 16,198; 
Atheism – 535;
Undeclared – 10,019.

Transport

Road network
Main road  (W→E): Budapest... – Karcag District (3 municipalities: Kenderes, Kisújszállás, Karcag) – ...Záhony
Main road  (N→S):  Tiszafüred... – Karcag District (1 municipality: Kunmadaras) – ...Fegyvernek

Railway network
Line 100 (W→E): Budapest... – Karcag District (3 municipalities: Kenderes, Kisújszállás, Karcag) – ...Záhony
Line 103 (S→N): Karcag District (3 municipalities: Karcag, Berekfürdő, Kunmadaras) – ...Tiszafüred (108)

Gallery

See also
List of cities and towns of Hungary

References

External links
Karcag District - HunMix.hu
Postal codes of the Karcag District

Districts in Jász-Nagykun-Szolnok County